The 2012–13 La Liga season (known as the Liga BBVA for sponsorship reasons) was the 82nd since its establishment. The campaign began on 18 August 2012, and ended on 1 June 2013. Barcelona won the league for a 22nd time, after leading the league the entire season and amassing 100 points, equalling Real Madrid's points record from the previous season. 
As in previous years, Nike provided the official ball for all matches, with a new Nike Maxim Liga BBVA model to be used throughout the season for all matches.

Teams
A total of 20 teams contested the league, including 17 sides from the 2011–12 season and three promoted from the 2011–12 Segunda División. This included the two top teams from the Segunda División, and the victorious team of the play-offs.

Villarreal CF, Sporting de Gijón and Racing de Santander were relegated to 2012–13 Segunda División the previous season: Villarreal were relegated after twelve years in La Liga, Sporting de Gijón returned to Segunda División after a four-year tenure in La Liga, while Racing de Santander ended ten consecutive seasons in La Liga, the longest period in its history.

The three teams that were relegated were replaced by three 2011–12 Segunda División sides: Deportivo de La Coruña made an immediate return to the top level as Segunda División champion. The second-placing team Celta de Vigo was also promoted to La Liga after a five-year absence. The third promoted team was decided in the promotion play-offs where Real Valladolid returned to La Liga after two seasons in Segunda División.

Stadia and locations

Personnel and sponsorship

1. Huawei is the sponsor for select matches.
2. On the back of shirt.
3. Barcelona makes a donation to UNICEF in order to display the charity's logo on the back of the club's kit.
4. On the shorts.
5. Málaga makes a donation to UNESCO in order to display the charity's logo on the club's kit.
6. On the sleeves.

Managerial changes

League table

Results

Awards

LaLiga Awards
La Liga's governing body, the Liga Nacional de Fútbol Profesional, honoured the competition's best players and coach with LaLiga Awards.

Top goalscorers
The Pichichi Trophy is awarded by newspaper Marca to the player who scores the most goals in a season.

Zamora Trophy
The Zamora Trophy is awarded by newspaper Marca to the goalkeeper with fewest goals-to-games ratio. Keepers must play at least 28 games of 60 or more minutes to be eligible for the trophy.

Source: Marca

Fair Play award
This award is given annually since 1999 to the team with the best fair play during the season. This ranking takes into account aspects such as cards, suspension of matches, audience behaviour and other penalties. This section not only aims to determine the best fair play, but also serves to break the tie in teams that are tied in all the other rules: points, head-to-head, goal difference and goals scored.

Source: 2012–13 Fair Play Rankings Season

Sources of cards and penalties: Referee's reports, Competition Committee's Sanctions, Appeal Committee Resolutions and RFEF section about Fair Play

Season statistics

Scoring
First goal of the season:  Fabrice Olinga for Málaga against Celta de Vigo (18 August 2012)
Last goal of the season:  Piti for Rayo Vallecano against Athletic Bilbao (1 June 2013)

Hat-tricks

 4 Player scored 4 goals
 5 Player scored 5 goals

Clean sheets
Most clean sheets: 20
Atlético Madrid
Fewest clean sheets: 5
Mallorca

Discipline
Most yellow cards (club): 139
Espanyol
 Fewest yellow cards (club): 56
 Barcelona
Most yellow cards (player): 19
Cristian Săpunaru (Zaragoza)
Most red cards (club): 12
Sevilla
 Fewest red cards (club): 2
 Barcelona
 Real Sociedad
Most red cards (player): 4
Alejandro Arribas (Osasuna)

Number of teams by autonomous community

See also
 List of Spanish football transfers summer 2012
 List of Spanish football transfers winter 2012–13
 2012–13 Segunda División
 2012–13 Copa del Rey

References

External links

LFP.es
LigaBBVA.com
sportYou.es
Inside Spanish Football

2012-13
1